Barnstone railway station was a railway station serving the villages of Barnstone, Granby and Langar, Nottinghamshire, on the Great Northern and London and North Western Joint Railway. It opened in 1879 and closed to regular traffic in 1953.

References

Disused railway stations in Nottinghamshire
Railway stations in Great Britain opened in 1879
Railway stations in Great Britain closed in 1953
Former Great Northern Railway stations
Former London and North Western Railway stations